Basin Mountain is the ninth-highest peak of the High Peaks Region in the Adirondack Park in the U.S. State of New York.  The peak was named by Verplanck Colvin for several basins formed between knobs on its slopes.  It is located in the High Peaks Wilderness Area. A basin is an area of land enclosed by higher land.

Basin Mountain is one of the highest peaks in the Great Range.

Basin Mountain can be climbed from many trailheads in the Adirondacks.  The shortest route to the peak starts at The Garden trailhead west of the village of Keene Valley.

References

External links 
 

Mountains of Essex County, New York
Adirondack High Peaks
Mountains of New York (state)